Anabarilius qionghaiensis is a species of ray-finned fish in the genus Anabarilius.

References

qionghaiensis
Fish described in 1986